Double electron capture is a decay mode of an atomic nucleus. For a nuclide (A, Z) with a number of nucleons A and atomic number Z, double electron capture is only possible if the mass of the nuclide (A, Z−2) is lower.

In this mode of decay, two of the orbital electrons are captured via the weak interaction by two protons in the nucleus, forming two neutrons (Two neutrinos are emitted in the process). Since the protons are changed to neutrons, the number of neutrons increases by two, while the number of protons Z decreases by two, and the atomic mass number A remains unchanged. As a result, by reducing the atomic number by two, double electron capture transforms the nuclide into a different element.

Example:
{| border="0"
|- style="height:2em;"
| ||+ ||2  ||→ || ||+ ||2 
|}

Rarity 
In most cases this decay mode is masked by other, more probable modes involving fewer particles, such as single electron capture. When all other modes are “forbidden” (strongly suppressed) double electron capture becomes the main mode of decay.

One reason is that the probability of double electron capture is stupendously small; the half-lives for this mode lie well above 10 years. A second reason is that the only detectable particles created in this process are X-rays and Auger electrons that are emitted by the excited atomic shell. In the range of their energies (~1–10 keV), the background is usually high. Thus, the experimental detection of double electron capture is more difficult than that for double beta decay.

Double electron capture can be accompanied by the excitation of the daughter nucleus. Its de-excitation, in turn, is accompanied by an emission of photons with energies of hundreds of keV.

Modes with positron emission 
If the mass difference between the mother and daughter atoms is more than two masses of an electron (1.022 MeV), the energy released in the process is enough to allow another mode of decay, called electron capture with positron emission. It occurs along with double electron capture, their branching ratio depending on nuclear properties.

When the mass difference is more than four electron masses (2.044 MeV), the third mode, called double positron decay, is allowed. Only six naturally occurring nuclides can decay via these three modes simultaneously.

Neutrinoless double electron capture 
The above-described process with the capture of two electrons and emission of two neutrinos (two-neutrino double electron capture) is allowed by the Standard Model of particle physics: No conservation laws (including lepton number conservation) are violated. However, if the lepton number is not conserved, or the neutrino is its own antiparticle, another kind of process can occur: the so-called neutrinoless double electron capture. In this case, two electrons are captured by nucleus, but neutrinos are not emitted. The energy released in this process is carried away by an internal bremsstrahlung gamma quantum.

Example:
{| border="0"
|- style="height:2em;"
| ||+ ||2  ||→ ||
|}

This mode of decay has never been observed experimentally, and would contradict the Standard Model if it were observed.

See also
Double beta decay
Neutrinoless double beta decay
Beta decay
Neutrino
Particle radiation
Radioactive isotope

References

External links
 

Nuclear physics
Radioactivity